John Brewer Reef, is located  offshore from Townsville, Queensland, Australia and measures . The origin of the reef's name is from the troop ships John Brewer, Kelso and Arab which sailed from Sydney for India on 16 June 1842. On board were 26 officers and 700 men of the 28th (North Gloucestershire) Regiment of Foot (The Slashers). On 30 June 1842, all ships grounded on reefs north-east of Palm Island. The reef where the John Brewer struck is known as Slashers Reefs after then 28th Regiment's nickname.

John Brewer Reef is within the Great Barrier Reef Marine Park. In March 2022 reef-wide cover of hard corals was 21.8 %, with some concerns from mass coral bleaching.  Citizen scientists have reported over 240 species of fish and invertebrates with the most notable being the whitetip reef shark.

References

Great Barrier Reef Marine Park